Carsten Henrichsen  (23 September 1824 - 30 April -1897) was a Danish landscape painter.

Biography
Henrichsen was born into a working-class family in Copenhagen in 1824. He at the Royal Danish Academy of Fine Arts from 1840 to 1845 and took drawing lessons with Frederik Ferdinand Helsted  in 1845–40.

From the late 1840s, he created vast number of paintings from Copenhagen and North Zealand. He received the Neuhausen Award in 1855 and a grant from the Academy in 1858.

Selected works
 Broen over Stadsgraven ved Nørreport (1848, Øregaard Museum)
 Udsigt fra Fortunen over Bernstorff mod Gentofte og København (1853)
 Prospekt af Roskilde med Domkirken (1857, Frederiksborg Museum)
 Amagerport (1860, Museum of Copenhagen)
 Ved Frihedsstøtten (c. 1860, Museum of Copenhagen)
 Strandgade, Sandvig (1872, Bornholms Kunstmuseum)
 Kobberdammen ved Hellebæk (1878, Aarhus Kunstmuseum, Roskilde Museum, Vejle Kunstmuseum)

Image gallery

References

External links

 Carsten Henrichsen at Kunstindeks Danmark
 Carsten Henrichsen at Artnet

Danish painters
Artists from Copenhagen
Royal Danish Academy of Fine Arts alumni
1824 births
1897 deaths